Ninan is a male given name popular among the Saint Thomas Christians (Nasranis) of Kerala, India. It is a Malayalam variant of the Syriac name Yohannan, equivalent to English John.

People with the name
 Ninan Koshy (1934–2015), Indian political thinker, foreign affairs expert, theologian and social analyst.

See also

References

Indian given names